Delphine Guehl (born 30 July 1978) is a French handball player.  

She was born in Metz, Moselle, France. She competed at the 2004 Summer Olympics, when France finished 4th.

References

External links

1978 births
Living people
Sportspeople from Metz
French female handball players
Olympic handball players of France
Handball players at the 2004 Summer Olympics
Mediterranean Games competitors for France
Competitors at the 2005 Mediterranean Games